Christian Welch (born 19 July 1994) is an Australian professional rugby league footballer who plays as a  for the Melbourne Storm in the NRL.

He is a NRL premiership winning player of 2020 and played for Queensland in the 2019 State of Origin series.

Early life
Welch was born in Sydney, New South Wales, Australia and moved to Townsville, Queensland at a young age where he began playing hockey. He has one older brother, Brendan, and a younger sister, Lauren, and his mother Lyn. His family relocated to Gladstone, Queensland before settling in Brisbane, Queensland. When settled in Brisbane, Welch was educated at Villanova College, Brisbane an Augustinian education for boys. Once graduating high school he attended University of Queensland studying Commerce.

He played his junior rugby league for the Eastern Suburbs Tigers and Gladstone Brothers, before being signed by the Melbourne Storm.

In 2013 and 2014, Welch played for the Melbourne Storm's NYC team. On 3 May 2014, he played for the Queensland under-20s team against the New South Wales under-20s team. While living in Melbourne he continued his studies at University of Melbourne.

Playing career

2015
Welch made his debut in round 9 of the 2015 NRL season for the Melbourne Storm against Parramatta. He came on in the second half and played the final 25 minutes to help seal a 28-10 victory away from home. The 21-year old went on to make another nine first grade appearances for the season.

2016
In his second season, Welch averaged 22 minutes over 17 games, he ranked second at the club for offloads behind Jesse Bromwich. On 22 April, Welch was re-signed by the Melbourne club on a one-year contract. On 2 October 2016, he played in the 2016 NRL Grand Final loss to the Cronulla-Sutherland Sharks.

2017
Welch played eight of the first nine games for Melbourne Storm, averaging career highs in metres run and tackles per game. Unfortunately it all came to an abrupt halt when he suffered an anterior cruciate ligament (ACL) knee injury against the St. George Illawarra Dragons in Round 9. He was forced to have a knee reconstruction, denying him of a chance to play in Melbourne's 2017 NRL Grand Final victory.

2018
Christian started the season with victory against the Leeds Rhinos in World Club Challenge. He was drafted into Queensland State of Origin camp ahead of Game 2 in Sydney, but did not play. He was also part of the Melbourne team that played in the 2018 NRL Grand Final.

2019
Welch made his State of Origin debut for Queensland in game 3.

2020
Welch was third time lucky playing in Melbourne's 2020 NRL Grand Final win over Penrith in a 26-20 win.
Welch played in games 1 and 3 of Queensland’s shock series victory in the 2020 State of Origin series.

2021
Welch played a total of 21 games for Melbourne in the 2021 NRL season as the club won 19 matches in a row and claimed the Minor Premiership.  Welch played in two finals matches including the preliminary final where Melbourne suffered a shock 10-6 loss against eventual premiers Penrith.

2022
In round 1 of the 2022 NRL season, Welch was taken from the field during the clubs match against the Wests Tigers.  It was later announced that Welch would be ruled out for the remainder of the season after suffering a torn achilles.

Honours
Team

 2016 NRL Grand Final Grand Finalists
 2018 World Club Challenge Winners
 2018 NRL Grand Final Grand Finalists
 2020 NRL Grand Final Premiers
 2020 State of Origin series Champions

References

External links
Melbourne Storm profile

1994 births
Living people
Australian people of Polish descent
Australian rugby league players
Melbourne Storm players
Queensland Rugby League State of Origin players
Eastern Suburbs Tigers players
Rugby league props
Rugby league second-rows
Rugby league players from Sydney